Jalal Cheraghpour (Persian: جلال چراغپور) (born 22 December 1950 in Tehran, Iran) is an Iranian football manager.

References 

1950 births
Iran national football team managers
Iranian football managers
Living people
Esteghlal Ahvaz F.C. managers